Ahmadpur East or Ahmadpur Sharqia (Punjabi, Saraiki) is one of the five tehsils, or administrative subdivisions, of Bahawalpur District in the Punjab province of Pakistan. Its capital is Ahmadpur East. With approximately 1 million inhabitants, it is the largest tehsil in terms of population in Pakistan. The main language spoken in the region is Saraiki. Urdu
And Punjabi are also spoken. Urdu and English are the official languages used in various educational and government institutions.

History 

The city of Ahmadpur East was once the capital of the former Princely State of Bahawalpur. It takes its name from Nawab Ahmed Khan abbasi, the son of nawab muhammad khan abbasi, who was the son of nawab rahimyar khan urf  bahawal khan salas iii Ahmed khan have ten sons names are Hayat khan,Nasir khan,Ibrahim khan,Daud khan,Islam khan,Alim khan,Mohabbat khan,Kabil khan,Qadir dinay khan,Qutab khan.Nawab of Bahawalpur who named it Ahmedpur.Numerous important buildings and places constructed by the former rulers of Bahawalpur State remain in the city, including Sadiq Garh Palace, Qadeem Mahal and Jamia Masjid Chowk Bazaar.

Geography and climate 

The city lies just south east of the Head Panjnad. It is situated 50 km from Bahawalpur, 470 km from Lahore, 15 km from Uch Shareef, 60 km from Yazman, 320 km from Faisalabad and about 750 km from the national capital, Islamabad. The west region of the city is called the Sindh. The chief crops are wheat, gram, cotton, sugarcane, dates, citrus and mangoes. Sheep and cattle are raised for export of wool and hides. It is chiefly desert irrigated by the Sutlej inundation canals and yields crops of wheat, cotton, and sugarcane. Farther south, the Cholistan, is a barren desert tract, bounded on the north and west by the Hakra depression with mound ruins of old settlements along its high banks; it is still inhabited by nomads. The climate is mainly hot and dry. In summer's the temperature reaches high forties degrees Celsius during the day and the nights slightly cooler. Since the city is located in a desert environment there is little rainfall. The weather conditions in area reach extremes in both summer and winter. Average temperature in summer is 33c and 18c in winter. Rainfall is very scarce and scanty. The average rainfall is 20 to 25 cm annually

Economy 

Ahmedpur East is also an important agricultural training and educational center. Soapmaking and cotton ginning are important enterprises; cotton, silk, embroidery, carpets, and extraordinarily delicate pottery are produced. Factories producing cottonseed oil and cottonseed cake were built in the 1970s. It is an important marketing center for the surrounding areas and is located on the crossroads between Peshawar, Lahore, Quetta and Karachi. Ahmedpur East is also known for its distinctly embroidered khusa and pottery which is made here. The surrounding area is mostly agricultural, which allows agricultural exports in many parts of the world. There is also a large market town for mangoes, dates, wheat, sugarcane, and cotton that bring in continuous demand all year round. In addition, it has soap making and cotton spinning factories".

Culture 

The city of Ahmedpur East is a tourist destination for not only locals but provides an important hotspot for historians and archeologists due to its rich heritage. The City Contains Sadiq Garh Palace Which Was Built In 1302 By Nawab Sadiq I And Many Old Buildings. The Derawar Fort is also in Ahmadpur East tehsil
Ahmedpur East is known for its cotton, silk, embroidery, carpets, and extraordinarily delicate pottery.

The saints of Ahmadpur Tehsil
(1) Syed Mohammad Abdullah Shah Madni Jilani,  son of Syed Abdul Rehman Jilani Dehlvi and a descendant of Sheikh Abdul Qadir Jilani. Born and raised in Medina, he walked miles between Mecca and Madina in the heat.  He then spent least 12 years of service at the Masjid-e-Nabwi and had a dream where Mohammad ordered him to find his murshid Sultan Bahu. He met Sultan Bahu on the 12th Rabi' al-awwal. During the reign of Nawab Bahawal Khan III, he migrated from Medina to Ahmadpur East for a permanent residence from 29th Ramazan 1241 H/6 May 1826 AD. He died on Friday of 29th Ramazan 1276 H/20 April 1860. His shrine is situated at Fatani Chowk, Fatani Street, Ahmadpur East. He was the 26th Shaikh of the Sarwari Qadri Order.

(2) Makhdoom Bahaudin Akbar, belonging to Bahaudin Zikarya’s 18th generation of descendants. He migrated from Multan to Ahmadpur East. He died in 26 Ramazan 1267/24 January 1851. He belongs to the Suhrawardiyya Order.

(3) Azmat Sultan, a descendant of Sultan Bahu. His father, Sultan Mohammad Hussain was a Sufi dervish. Azmat Sultan migrated to Ahmadpur East along with his family and resided there. It was here that he died and his shrine is also located here.

(4) Abdul Asad Khan Afghan: There is a khanqah by the name of Abdul Asad Khan in Ahmadpur East. He is known as being the khalifah of Khawaja Aaqil Mohammad.

(5) Noor Shah Bukhari: In Ahmadpur Sharqia, his shrine is located near Qilla Tehsil. He is from the progeny of Syed Jalal Bukhari. He spent most of his time in the Zikr of Allah. The order of his followers initiated at the desert area.

(6) Molvi Hakeem Gul Mohammad: His khanqah exists in Ahmadpur East. His family was prominent for its knowledge and herbal tips. The shrines of his ancestors still exist in Multan and Uch, Pakistan. He was the khalifah and a disciple of Aaqil Mohammad. His family lineage and biography is preserved in his writing Takmala Sharif.

(7) Khawaja Muhammad Abdul Malik Siddique belongs to Ahmad Pur Sharkia. He was the Peer-e-Tariqat of Naqashbandi Golden Chain. Khawaja Muhammad Abdul Malik Siddique was Khalifa of Peer Fazal Ali Qureshi of Miskeen Pur sharif District Muzaffar Garh. Now his son Khawaja Abdul Majid Siddiqui is the Sajjada Nasheen of Khanqah Malikia. Khanqah. Khawaja Abdul Majid Siddiqu is Khalifa of Peer Shaikh Mufti Muhammad Fareed Sahib in Naqashbandi.

See also
 List of people from Ahmedpur East

References

Tehsils of Bahawalpur District